Radar mile or radar nautical mile is an auxiliary constant for converting a (delay) time to the corresponding scale distance on the radar display.

Radar timing is usually expressed in microseconds. To relate radar timing to distances traveled by radar energy, you should know that radiated energy from radar set travels at approximately 984 feet per microsecond. With the knowledge that a nautical mile is approximately 6,080 feet, we can figure the approximate time required for radar energy to travel one nautical mile using the following calculation:

A pulse-type radar set transmits a short burst of electromagnetic energy. The target range is determined by measuring elapsed time while the pulse travels to and returns from the target. Because two-way travel is involved, a total time of 12.35 microseconds per nautical mile will elapse between the start of the pulse from the antenna and its return to the antenna from a target in a range of 1 nautical mile. In equation form, this is:

References 

Radar